Kondopozhsky District is an administrative district (raion), one of fifteen in the Republic of Karelia, Russia. It is located in the south of the republic. Its administrative center is the town of Kondopoga. As of the 2010 Census, the total population of the district was 41,114, with the population of Kondopoga accounting for 80.2% of that number.

Geography
Kondopozhsky District covers the forested lake area to the northwest of Lake Onega.  The terrain is a combination of lakes, rocky ridges, glacial moraines, and glacial alluvial plains.  The lakes and rivers are oriented northwest to southeast to flow into Lake Onega, and eventually into the Baltic Sea.  The Kivach Nature Reserve is located in the District.  it is a federal-level strict ecological reserve, established for the protection and scientific study of the taiga ecology of the region.  A public access zone supports tourist visits to the Kivach Waterfall.

Administrative and municipal status
Within the framework of administrative divisions, Kondopozhsky District is one of the fifteen in the Republic of Karelia and has administrative jurisdiction over one town (Kondopoga) and seventy-seven rural localities. As a municipal division, the district is incorporated as Kondopozhsky Municipal District. The town of Kondopoga and three rural localities are incorporated into an urban settlement, while the remaining seventy-four rural localities are incorporated into eight rural settlements within the municipal district. The town of Kondopoga serves as the administrative center of both the administrative and municipal district.

References

Notes

Sources

Districts of the Republic of Karelia
 
